Six male athletes from Malaysia competed at the 1996 Summer Paralympics in Atlanta, United States.

See also
Malaysia at the Paralympics
Malaysia at the 1996 Summer Olympics

References 

Nations at the 1996 Summer Paralympics
1996
Summer Paralympics